The Penn Quakers baseball team is a varsity intercollegiate athletic team of the University of Pennsylvania in Philadelphia, Pennsylvania, United States. The team is a member of the Ivy League, which is part of the National Collegiate Athletic Association's Division I. The University of Pennsylvania's first baseball team was fielded in 1875. The team plays its home games at Meiklejohn Stadium in Philadelphia, Pennsylvania. The Quakers are coached by John Yurkow.

The Quakers won four Eastern Intercollegiate Baseball League championships, and have claimed an Ivy League title, advancing to the NCAA Division I Baseball Championship five times.

See also
 List of NCAA Division I baseball programs

References

External links
 

 
Baseball teams established in 1875